Streptomyces griseiniger is a bacterium species from the genus of Streptomyces which has been isolated in Australia. Streptomyces griseiniger produces nigericin.

See also 
 List of Streptomyces species

References

Further reading

External links
Type strain of Streptomyces griseiniger at BacDive -  the Bacterial Diversity Metadatabase

griseiniger
Bacteria described in 2008